Underwater Cinematographer is the 2005 debut album by The Most Serene Republic.

Track listing
All songs written by The Most Serene Republic.  Lyrics by Adrian Jewett.
"Prologue"
"Content Was Always My Favorite Colour"
"(Oh) God"
"The Protagonist Suddenly Realizes What He Must Do in the Middle of Downtown Traffic"
"Proposition 61"
"Where Cedar Nouns and Adverbs Walk"
"In Places, Empty Spaces"
"Relative's Eyes"
"King of No One"
"You're a Loose Cannon McArthur...But You Get the Job Done"
"Epilogue"

References

2005 albums
The Most Serene Republic albums
Arts & Crafts Productions albums